SKA Lviv was a Soviet multi-sports club founded in Lviv, Ukrainian SSR. The club was created as part of sport section of the Carpathian Military District in 1949 and existed until 1989.

As SKA Karpaty the club dissolved the main team was reorganized as SFK Drohobych and moved to Drohobych, Lviv Oblast (see FC Halychyna Drohobych), simultaneously FC Karpaty Lviv was reinstated as well. Over most of its history the club was the secondary team in Lviv.

Name change
 1949 – 1956 ODO Lvov
 1957 – 1957 OSK Lvov
 1957 – 1959 SKVO Lvov
 1960 – 1971 SKA Lvov
 1972 – 1976 SK Lutsk (reorganization; merged with FC Torpedo Lutsk)
 1973 – 1976 SKA Lvov (at amateur competitions)
 1977 – 1981 SKA Lvov (reinstated as professional team)
 1982 – 1989 SKA Karpaty Lvov (merged with FC Karpaty Lviv)

History

Poor start and Spartak Lviv oblivion
During its history the club went through several transformations and mergers. It was founded in 1949 as ODO Lviv (in Russian ODO means the Oblast Dome [Club] of Officers) and began its legacy in the Second Group of the Soviet football competitions (Soviet First League). SKA Lviv was part of the Fitness-Sports Union of Armed Forces under the jurisdiction of the Sports Committee of the Armed Forces of USSR. In western Ukraine all organizations of central government were centers of the Russian culture, especially the Soviet Army. The army-men team played along with their city rivals Spartak Lviv which placed second. The performance of the SKA Lviv was under par and the club relegated next year to amateur level as the Second Group was liquidated in 1950. Spartak Lviv was transferred under the jurisdiction of FSC Dynamo which was not able to prepare the team for the next season, therefore Spartak Lviv was successfully dissolved.

This way SKA Lviv became the best club of the city. For the next several years the club participated in the republican championship among the Fitness and Sports clubs (KFK competitions). In 1950 SKA Lviv placed second after Spartak Uzhhorod which became the champion of Ukrainian SSR. Next season the club won its zonal tournament against several other Lviv teams such as Kharchovyk (Tobacco factory), Iskra, Dynamo and eventually became vice-champion winning over ODO Kiev. In 1952 SKA Lviv placed only 4th in its zone and higher than its city rival Kharchovyk Vynnyky.

First League successes
With another reorganization of championship SKA Lviv returned to the Soviet First League under the leadership of Aleksey Grinin. Among notable players that time were Yozhef Betsa, Myroslav Dumansky, Ernest Kesler, and others. In 1956 for SKA Lviv played the future Dynamo Kiev captain, Vasyl Turyanchyk. In 1957 ODO Lviv won the Class B tournament and managed to advance to the 1/8 finals of Soviet Cup where they were facing Spartak Moscow. On June 6, 1957 both teams met at the SKA Stadium. Most of the Spartak players a year ago won the Olympic gold in Melbourne and managed to pull a win in the second half 1:2.

In 1960 it became SKA (Sport Club of Army) for all Army clubs except the Moscow's one, which became CSKA (the Central Sport Club of the Army). In 1982 the SKA Lviv from the Soviet Second League was united with the other club from Lviv, FC Karpaty Lviv, which participated in the Soviet First League. The new team has taken place of FC Karpaty Lviv and was renamed into SKA Karpaty Lviv. In 1990 the team was liquidated and in its place was formed SFC Drohobych in the Soviet Second League. Soon, after few months, the club was renamed again in FC Halychyna Drohobych. Later, there was another club that entered the Ukrainian Second League called as the SKA-Orbita Lviv, and in 2008 FC Halychyna Lviv that won the national amateur cup entered the Ukrainian Cup.

FC Karpaty Lviv split from SKA Karpaty Lviv in 1989 and entered the Soviet Second League. In 1990 both teams competed in the Buffer League, West Zone.

League and Cup history

SKA Lviv

SC Lutsk

SKA Karpaty Lviv

Lviv derby

Polish period
 Pogoń Lwów – Czarni Lwów 3:0 1:3 (1927), 4:0 1:1 (1928), 2:0 2:1 (1929), 0:0 0:1 (1930), 2:1 1:1 (1931), 1:0 1:0 (1932), 2:1 1:1 (1933) +8=4-2
 Pogoń Lwów – Hasmonea Lwów 1:2 2:2 (1927), 2:0 3:0 (1928) +2=1-1
 Czarni Lwów – Hasmonea Lwów 2:3 0:3 (1927), +/- (3:0) 3:1 (1928) +2=0-2
 Pogoń Lwów – Lechia Lwów 5:1 3:0 (1931) +2=0-0
 Czarni Lwów – Lechia Lwów 3:2 4:2 (1931) +2=0-0

Soviet period
The Soviet Lviv derby started in 1949 when as part of the Soviet Vtoraya Gruppa (second tier) in its Ukrainian Zone met Spartak Lviv and DO Lviv both games were won by Spartak 2:1 and 3:1 (home and away respectfully). 

It was the first face off of two Lviv teams after the earlier Polish Lwow derby between Pogon and Czarni that existed since establishment of Ekstraklasa in 1927–1933 (seven seasons). Until the establishment of Karpaty in 1960s, it was the only meeting between Soviet teams of masters from Lviv. In 1950 due to reorganization of the Soviet football competitions Spartak Lviv was merged with the local Dynamo Lviv, while SKA (or DO) competed at republican level.

In 1960s the Lviv derby was revived as part of the Soviet Class A Vtoraya Gruppa (second tier) between now SKA Lviv and Karpaty Lviv (sponsored by Lviv Electronic Factory "Elektron"). The derby lasted only for four seasons SKA – Karpaty 1:0 0:1 (1966), 1:2 0:0 (1967), 1:5 1:4 (1968), 1:1 1:2 (1969). That was it for the Soviet period of Lviv city football derbies. 

In 1981 both teams were merged as SKA-Karpaty which existed until 1989 and was dissolved. After that in Lviv were reinstated FC Karpaty, while players the Army team which was abandoned were transferred to Drohobych where there was reviving Naftovyk Drohobych, but instead was established FC Halychyna Drohobych.

Ukrainian period
 Karpaty Lviv – FC Lviv 2:1 4:2 (2008–09), 0:1 1:1 (2018–19), 0:0 0:0 1:1 1:1 (2019–20) +2=5-1
 Karpaty-2/3 Lviv – Dynamo Lviv 3:1 1:0 (1999–2000), 0:1 0:3 (2000–01), 0:1 1:0 (2001–02) +3=0-3
 FC Lviv – Rukh Lviv (2020–21)
 Karpaty-3 Lviv – SKA-Orbita Lviv 0:0 1:1 (2001–02)
 Dynamo Lviv – SKA-Orbita Lviv 0:0 4:0 (2001–02)
 Karpaty-2 Lviv – FC Lviv-2 2:0 1:3 (2009–10)

See also
 FC Karpaty Lviv
 SKA-Orbita Lviv
 FC Lviv (1992)
 FC Halychyna Drohobych

References
 Team history and records
 Short historical overview of SKA Karpaty Lviv 
 Short historical overview of SKA Lviv

External links
 Soviet Archives

 
SKA Lviv
SKA Lviv
Association football clubs established in 1949
Association football clubs disestablished in 1989
1949 establishments in Ukraine
1989 disestablishments in Ukraine
Football clubs in the Ukrainian Soviet Socialist Republic
Armed Forces sports society
Defunct football clubs in Ukraine
Military association football clubs in Ukraine